Manjula Sood, MBE, is a British politician, community service participant and former educator. In 2008, Sood became the first Asian female Lord Mayor in the United Kingdom.

Early life
Sood immigrated to the United Kingdom in 1970. She became in 1973 the first female Asian primary school teacher in Leicester, England. She taught there for almost twenty years before retiring because of ill health. During her time as a teacher, she introduced multiculturalism in the education sector.

Political career

Manjula Sood was first elected after the death of her councillor husband. Paul Sood was one of the first Asians in Britain to become a councillor. He was elected as a Leicestershire County Councillor in 1982 and served Leicester for almost 14 years before his death in 1996. Manjula stood in the by-election for her husband's former seat and won.

In May 2008, Sood became the first Asian female Lord Mayor in the United Kingdom, in over 800 years of the Lord Mayor title.

Sood ceased to be a Councillor in 2019.

Current positions

 Trustee and an executive director for the Leicester Council of Faiths, which promotes a better understanding among religions
 Vice Chair and Women's Officer for Constituency Labour Party (CLP)
 Member of Asian Refuge Shelter, assisting Asian women going through turmoil in their private lives
 Member of the Afro-Caribbean Working Party
 Member of the Standard and Audit Committee of Leicester City Council, safeguarding the Audit Commission's Code of Conduct, which elected members of the council and council officials must abide by
 Member of Children and Young Persons scrutiny committee
 Trustee for the North Memorial Homes in Leicester, a charity created for war veterans
 Vice Chair and Public Relations officer for a fibromyalgia charity
 Member of the Leicester Domestic Violence forum
 Member of the Older People Forum where she raises the political profile of older people, locally and nationally
 Member of the Faith Regeneration Advisory Group, engaged with developing a multi religion centre in Leicester
 Member on the Inter Faith Network UK since 1995
 Chair of Mental Health regional conferences and member, Department of Health Care Services Improvement Partnership (CSIP)

Initiatives championed
 Organiser for liaising with the Indian High Commission to come to Leicester on a monthly basis to issue visas
 Chair of Naarilets, an organisation encouraging ethnic minority women in Leicester to become more immersed in commerce

Education
 BA and MA
 Worked on a high-profile Rural Health research project for the Johns Hopkins University of Baltimore in 1967 as part of a PhD
 Completed postgraduate teaching course at Leicester University

Awards and achievements
In July 2008, she was awarded an Honorary Doctorate of Laws by Leicester University.

Manjula was awarded an MBE by Her Majesty, Queen Elizabeth II for services to the community in Leicester in June 2009. Manjula is the Sport England Regional Champion for East Midlands.

 Leicestershire and Rutland Women of the Year Award 2005, the first Asian woman to receive the award
 Served as the High Bailiff of Leicester from May 2007
 NRI Institute Excellence Award 2008 for Contribution to Politics
 Labour Party Merit Award Winner for contribution to the Labour Party 2004. The first Asian women to win.
 Red Hot Curry's top 300 most influential Asian women in the UK 2002
 Triangle Media Group Global Award for outstanding contribution to local politics 2006
 Awarded an honorary award by Leicestershire Asian Business Association (LABA) for assistance to small businesses

Benchmarks
 Leicester City's only female Asian elected councillor, a position held since 1996
 Has partaken in the last three International Women's Day, speaking to large audiences on the challenges and barriers women face in society and the progress they have thus made since the turn of the last century.

Positions held
 Non Executive Director at the Glenfield Hospital from 1998 to 2001 for the Leicester NHS Trust 
 Vice Chair of Equal Opportunities, Education and Social Services for Leicester City Council
 Chaired Leicester City Council's Health Commission
 Governor for Leicester College ; as the only female ethnic minority governor, she worked with the principal, the governing body and the executive to make certain equal opportunity policies were in place and being applied.
 Governor for the Trinity Hospital in Leicester; primarily responsible for raising concerns and managing the needs of elderly residents as well as ensuring spending was within the assigned budget.

Community and other activities
 Mentors children and teenagers encouraging them to overcome anxieties and fears and to deal with academic related issues
 Interviewed the Chancellor of the Exchequer The Rt Hon Gordon Brown MP on behalf of the Government and the Labour Party.
 Introduced to Prince Charles as one of the best primary school teachers in Leicester.
 Selected to carry The Queen's Jubilee Baton Relay during the Commonwealth Games in 2002
 The late Rt Hon Sir Keith Joseph MP and Education Secretary visited her class and met the students
 Part of many general election and local election campaigns
 As a regular fundraiser, she raised enough funds to donate a fluid warmer cabinet in the Accident and Emergency Unit at Leicester Royal Infirmary in 2001
 Contributor to the Great Ormond Street Hospital for children in London
 Contributor for LOROS, a hospice in Leicester
 Sponsors children in India via ActionAid and Sai Organisation
 Member of Good Values Group, promoting core human values in the community
 Selected for Enterprise day in Moat Community College on 1 February 2013 among other individuals.

Personal life
Sood resides in Leicester.

References

External links
Official website

Living people
Year of birth missing (living people)
Indian emigrants to the United Kingdom
Women councillors in England
Mayors of places in Leicestershire
Women mayors of places in England